The Netherlands women's national cricket team toured Pakistan in April 2001. They played Pakistan in 7 One Day Internationals, losing the series 4–3.

Squads

WODI Series

1st ODI

2nd ODI

3rd ODI

4th ODI

5th ODI

6th ODI

7th ODI

References

External links
Netherlands Women tour of Pakistan 2000/01 from Cricinfo

2001 in women's cricket
International women's cricket competitions in Pakistan
International cricket competitions in 2001
Pakistan
Women's international cricket tours of Pakistan
2001 in Pakistani women's sport